Climbing! (also known as Mountain Climbing!) is the debut studio album by American hard rock band Mountain. It was released on March 7, 1970, by Windfall Records.

Background  
In 1969, Leslie West recorded his debut solo album, titled Mountain, with Felix Pappalardi on bass and drummer Norman Smart. Smart was replaced by Corky Laing on drums and percussion, and keyboardist Steve Knight was added to form the classic Mountain lineup, with Pappalardi as producer.

Windfall Records released Climbing! on March 7, 1970, and it reached number 17 on the American Billboard Top Albums chart. It included the group's best-known song, "Mississippi Queen", which became a hit, and "Never in My Life", which was regularly aired on contemporary FM radio. Both were sung by West, while Pappalardi supplied the vocal on another radio favorite, "Theme for an Imaginary Western".

Critical reception 

Matthew Greenwald, in a review for AllMusic, gave the album four and a half out of five stars. In Christgau's Record Guide: Rock Albums of the Seventies (1981), Robert Christgau wrote:

Track listing

On the 2003 Legacy Recordings CD, a live version of "For Yasgur's Farm" was added as a bonus track.

Personnel
Band
 Leslie West – guitars on all tracks, vocals
 Felix Pappalardi – bass guitar on all tracks except 6 and 7; piano on tracks 1, 2 and 9; rhythm guitar on track 7, vocals; production
 Steve Knight – organ on tracks 2, 3, 4 and 5; Mellotron on tracks 2 and 9; handbells on track 4
 Corky Laing – drums on all tracks except 6 and 7; percussion on tracks 7 and 9

Additional personnel
 Bud Prager – executive production
 Bob d'Orleans – engineering
 Lillian Douma – engineering assistance
 Beverly Weinstein – art direction
 Gail Collins – cover artwork, photography

Charts

Certifications

References

External links 

1970 debut albums
Mountain (band) albums
Windfall Records albums
Albums produced by Felix Pappalardi
Albums recorded at Record Plant (New York City)